Liu Xiaotong (born 16 February 1990) is a Chinese volleyball player. 

She participated at the 2014 FIVB Volleyball World Grand Prix, 2014 Montreux Volley Masters, 2016 Montreux Volley Masters, 2017 Montreux Volley Masters, 2018 Montreux Volley Masters, 2019 Montreux Volley Masters,  and the 2018 FIVB Volleyball Women's Nations League. On club level, she plays for Beijing.

In November 2021, she has announced her retirement from the sport after a career filled with “ups and downs”.

Clubs
  Beijing (2006 - 2021)
 Temporary transfer to Tianjin 2017-2018 Season Final stage

Awards
 2014 FIVB World Grand Prix "1st Best Outside Spiker"
 2018–19 Chinese Volleyball League "Best Outside Spiker"

References

External links
 Player's biography FIVB Volleyball World Grand Prix 2014

Chinese women's volleyball players
Living people
1990 births
Volleyball players from Jilin
Olympic gold medalists for China in volleyball
Volleyball players at the 2016 Summer Olympics
2016 Olympic gold medalists for China
People from Yanbian
Wing spikers
Asian Games gold medalists for China
Asian Games medalists in volleyball
Medalists at the 2018 Asian Games
Volleyball players at the 2018 Asian Games
Volleyball players at the 2020 Summer Olympics
21st-century Chinese women